Jesse Lonergan (born 14 November 1994) is an Australian rules footballer who played for the Gold Coast Football Club in the Australian Football League (AFL). He was recruited by the club in the 2012 National Draft, with pick #13. He made his AFL debut in Round 6, 2013, against  at Carrara Stadium. He was delisted at the conclusion of the 2018 season.

He was recruited in 2019 by the Woodville West Torrens Football Club in the SANFL. In 2020 played in Woodville West Torrens Football Club's winning premiership team.

Originally from Launceston, he is the nephew of Sam Lonergan.

References

External links

1994 births
Living people
Gold Coast Football Club players
Australian rules footballers from Tasmania
Launceston Football Club players
Woodville-West Torrens Football Club players